Susanna of Fontanarossa (1435–1489) was the mother of navigator and explorer Christopher Columbus.

Biography 
Susanna was born in the hillside village of Monticellu, on the then Genoese island of Corsica, to a wealthy Catholic family.  Her family owned substantial real estate in Quezzi, a little village in the low-lying valley of Bisagno (part of the present-day city of Genoa).  She married Domenico Colombo in 1455 and bore him 5 children: Cristoforo, Bartolomeo, Giovanni, Giacomo, and a daughter named Bianchinetta.

A notarised document of sale in the Genoa state archive contains the Latinate text «Sozana, (quondam) de Jacobi de Fontana Rubea, uxor Dominici de Columbo de Ianua ac Christophorus et Pelegrinus filii eorum», which can be translated as "Susanna was (the daughter) of Giacomo from Fontanarossa of the Bisagno, wife of Domenico Columbus from Genoa, their sons are Cristoforo and Pellegrino." The Val Bisagno  was a significant inland district in the ancient Republic of Genoa including the valley of the Bisagno. Thus she was described as 'Susanna from Fontanarossa' within the Val Bisagno, rather than Suzanna Fontarossa.

Today the hilltop village of Fontanarossa frazione of Gorreto, Genoa, Liguria, in the Val Trebbia (31 km inland from Genoa, at ) and only 6 km beyond the watershed of the river Bisagno, has a marble stone with the inscription Susanna Fontanarossa, the mother of Christopher Columbus, was born in this village. ("In questo borgo nacque Susanna Fontanarossa, madre di Cristoforo Colombo.").

Little is known about her after 1484. She died before her husband, Domenico.

References

People from Corsica
Susanna
1435 births
1489 deaths
15th-century Genoese people